Bryanne Stewart (born 9 December 1979) is a former professional tennis player from Australia. She has been ranked World No. 16 in doubles and has won three doubles titles. In singles, she reached the third round of the Australian Open in 2000.

Her best result at a Grand Slam was reaching the semifinals of the women's doubles tournament at the 2005 Wimbledon Championships, partnering Samantha Stosur, before losing to Cara Black and Liezel Huber.

WTA career finals

Doubles (4) (3-1)

ITF Finals

Singles (0–3)

Doubles (11–15)

References

External links
 
 
 
 

1979 births
Living people
Australian female tennis players
Sportswomen from New South Wales
Tennis players from Sydney
21st-century Australian women